Kamilla Birkedal Larsen (née Kristensen; born 2 September 1983) is a Danish team handball player, playing for Handball Club Odense and for the Danish women's national handball team. She attended Kalundborg Gymnasium.

At the 2010 European Women's Handball Championship she reached the bronze final and placed fourth with the Danish team.

She is married with the Greenlandic coach Jakob Larsen.

References

1983 births
Living people
Danish female handball players
People from Holbæk Municipality
Sportspeople from Region Zealand